Love Thy Neighbour in Australia is a seven-episode Australian television comedy series which debuted on ATN-7 in Sydney on 9 April 1980. Most of the episodes were broadcast in Melbourne beginning the following month. It was produced as a sequel to the British series Love Thy Neighbour (1972–1976) featuring one of the major protagonists Eddie Booth (Jack Smethurst). The central concept is that Eddie has relocated to Australia and intends to send for his wife and child once he has settled. While the earlier series had focused on Eddie's rivalry with his neighbour Bill Reynolds, the sequel focused on a new set of relationships unrelated to the original show's premise. Here, he is boarding with a married couple, Joyce and Bernard, and conflicting with his Dutch-Australian next door neighbour, Jim Lawson, played by Russell Newman. External scenes were shot in Auburn Road, Auburn NSW with 191 Auburn Road serving as Joyce, Bernard and Eddie's home.

Cast
 Jack Smethurst as Eddie Booth 
 Russell Newman as Jim Lawson 
 Robert Hughes as Bernard Smith 
 Sue Jones as Joyce Smith 
 Graham Rouse as Cyril 
 Ken Goodlet as Joe Marley 
 Kevin Leslie as Charlie 
 Gordon McDougall as Vicar 
 Kris McQuade as Liz 
 Rouna Daley as Sally 
 Ron Shand as Arnold 
 Fred Steele as Information Officer 
 Frank Lloyd as Doctor 
 Lynne Porteous as Barmaid 
 Mervyn Drake as Airline Steward 
 Lex Marinos as Kitty

References

Bibliography
 Howard Maxford. Hammer Complete: The Films, the Personnel, the Company. McFarland, 2018.

External links
 

1970s Australian television series
English-language television shows
Australian comedy television series
Television shows set in Sydney